The 2010–11 Slovenian PrvaLiga was the 20th season of top-tier football in Slovenia. The season began in July 2010 and ended on 29 May 2011. Koper were the defending champions, having won their first the previous season.

Teams

Drava were directly relegated at the end of the 2009–10 season to Slovenian Second League after the last-place finish, having narrowly avoided relegation in the relegation play-offs in the 2007–08 and 2008–09 seasons. Interblock, who placed ninth in 2009–10, entered relegation play-offs and were beaten by Triglav, the runners-up of the 2009–10 Slovenian Second League.

Along with Triglav, Primorje were promoted back to top flight as champions of the Slovenian Second League, having been relegated at the end of the 2008–09 season.

Team summaries

League table

Relegation play-offs
The ninth-placed team of the PrvaLiga, Nafta, was supposed to play a two-legged relegation play-off against the runners-up of the 2010–11 Slovenian Second League, Interblock, but they declined promotion and the play-offs were cancelled.

Results
Every team plays four times against their opponents, twice at home and twice on the road, for a total of 36 matches.

First half of the season

Second half of the season

Statistics

Top goalscorers
Source: PrvaLiga, Soccerway

Average attendances

See also
2010 Slovenian Supercup
2010–11 Slovenian Football Cup
2010–11 Slovenian Second League

References
General

Specific

External links
Official website of the PrvaLiga 

Slovenian PrvaLiga seasons
Slovenia
1